Burren can refer to:
The Burren, an area dominated by karst landscape, in County Clare, Ireland
Burren National Park, the national park in County Clare, Ireland
Burren (barony), an historical administrative division of County Clare, Ireland
Burren (townland), a townland in County Cavan, Ireland
Burren, County Down, a village in Northern Ireland
Burren and Cliffs of Moher Geopark, a designated area of geological interest in County Clare, Ireland
Burren College of Art, an art college in Ballyvaughan, County Clare, Ireland
Burren Way, an official long-distance walking trail across the Burren
Burrén and Burrena, twin hills in Aragon, Spain

See also
Buran (disambiguation)